Roberto Bressan (born 5 May 1960) is an Italian former professional racing cyclist. He rode in the 1985 Tour de France.

References

External links
 

1960 births
Living people
Italian male cyclists
Place of birth missing (living people)
Cyclists from Friuli Venezia Giulia